Gabriela Bustelo (Madrid, 1962) is a Spanish author, journalist and translator.

Biography
Included in the 1990 neorealist generation of Spanish novelists, Bustelo made her debut with Veo Veo (Anagrama, 1996), which placed her in the literary Generation X She shares with José Ángel Mañas, Ray Loriga and Lucía Etxebarria a sharp literary style influenced by commercial culture — advertising, pop music, film and television. Gabriela Bustelo is one of the few Spanish women who have written science fiction. Her second novel Planeta Hembra (RBA, 2001), located in New York, is a dystopia that envisaged —almost two decades ago— the underlying conflict between women and men that in the 21st century has become the MeToo Movement as a global battle of the sexes. La historia de siempre jamás (El Andén, 2007) portrays the immorality and shallowness of European political elites. In 1996 she began to write pieces on art and culture for publications such as Vogue and Gala (magazine), having penned political columns for fifteen years in national print media and digital newspapers. She contributed cultural articles to Colombian magazine "Arcadia" (revistaarcadia.com) from 2005 to 2015.

Translations 
Bustelo has translated to Spanish the works of classics such as Charles Dickens, George Eliot, Rudyard Kipling, Oscar Wilde, Edgar Allan Poe and Mark Twain; and well-known contemporaries including Raymond Chandler, Muriel Spark and Margaret Atwood.

See also 
 Spanish Literature
 Science-fiction
 Translation
 Dystopia
 Neorealism (art)

References 

 
 Review in Spanish

1962 births
Living people
English–Spanish translators
Spanish science fiction writers
Spanish women novelists
Spanish translators
People from Madrid
Women science fiction and fantasy writers
20th-century Spanish novelists
20th-century Spanish women writers
20th-century translators